The Administration of Estates Act 1925 is an Act passed in 1925 by the British Parliament that consolidated, reformed, and simplified the rules relating to the administration of estates in England and Wales.

Principal reforms
All authority that a personal representative had with respect to chattels real (such as fixtures) was extended to cover any matter dealing with real estate as well.

With respect to the property of any estate (excepting entailed interests), there were abolished:

 all existing rules of descent (whether arising from the common law, custom, gavelkind, Borough English or otherwise)
 tenancy by the curtesy and any other estate a husband may have where his wife dies intestate
 dower, freebench and any other estate a wife may have where her husband dies intestate
 escheat to the Crown, the Duchy of Lancaster, the Duchy of Cornwall, or to a mesne lord

The rules governing the distribution of intestate estates were replaced by a single statutory framework.

Later significant amendments
The Act has been subsequently amended in certain respects by the following:

 Intestates’ Estates Act 1952
 Inheritance (Provision for Family and Dependants) Act 1975
 Estates of Deceased Persons (Forfeiture Rule and Law of Succession) Act 2011
 Inheritance and Trustees' Powers Act 2014

In fiction
The Act plays a major role (as the 'Property Act') in the 1927 mystery novel Unnatural Death by Dorothy L. Sayers, its commencement with respect to intestate estates providing the motive for a seemingly motiveless murder which Lord Peter Wimsey must solve.

See also
Administration of an estate on death
Ultimogeniture

References

United Kingdom Acts of Parliament 1925